Namathu Eelanadu is a Tamil language newspaper. It was founded in 2002.It was known for promoting a Tamil nationalist prospective. The paper's office in Jaffna was raided by the Sri Lanka Army on 15 December 2005 and its staff interrogated.Sinnathamby Sivamaharajah was the  managing director  of the newspaper. He was shot dead at his temporary home in Tellippalai, which was located 300 meters inside the Valikamam North High security zone.

References

External links
Official Website

2002 establishments in Sri Lanka
Daily newspapers published in Sri Lanka
Mass media in Jaffna
Publications established in 2002
Tamil-language newspapers published in Sri Lanka